The Astra-Protopopescu or Astra-Proto was a Romanian reconnaissance aircraft flown and tested in 1925.

Design and development
The Astra-Proto, designed by Lieutenant-Colonel Ștefan Protopopescu and built by the Astra Aircraft Factory at Arad was intended as a reconnaissance aircraft. It was a biplane with constant chord wings, straight-edged and slightly swept at about 2°. Their tips were rounded. The lower wing was a little shorter and smaller in area, providing 47% of the total. The structure of the wings, like that of the rest of the aircraft, was entirely wood and they were each built around two spars. The bay was formed by a parallel pair of interplane struts on each side, together with bracing wires; each pair of struts leaned forwards because of the stagger and also slightly outwards. The central upper wing was joined to the upper fuselage by cabane struts. These leaned outwards at the front and rear of the wing, the latter supplemented with a central, transverse inverted V-pair. Only the upper wing carried the long ailerons which occupied about 60% of the span.

Its engine was a  Hispano-Suiza 8F water-cooled V-8 with its radiator in the nose.  The fuselage was basically of rectangular cross-section, though the upper fuselage was formed by a curved decking. The pilot's open cockpit was under the upper wing trailing edge; both the upper and lower trailing edges had cut-outs to improve his view. The observer/gunner sat in a second cockpit immediately behind the pilot, equipped with dual controls as well as cameras and radio. Three machine guns could also be mounted there.  The fuselage tapered aft to conventional, unbalanced tail surfaces with a continuously curved tailplane and elevators positioned near the top of the fuselage.  The fin and rudder were also smoothly curved together; the latter extended to the keel and worked in a rounded elevator cut-out.

The Astra-Protopopescu had a conventional, fixed tailskid undercarriage.  A short V-form strut was attached to each lower fuselage longeron, joined by a cross-piece at their apexes, above which a single axle bearing the main wheels was rubber sprung. The wooden tailskid was also rubber sprung.

The exact date of the first flight of the Astra-Protopopescu is not known but its tests had been concluded by June 1925. Though the results were satisfactory and although it met the requirements set by the Romanian Ministry for War, no orders for serial production were received.

Specifications

See also
 Proto 1
 Proto 2 (aircraft)
 Astra Aircraft Factory

References

1920s Romanian military aircraft
Ștefan Protopopescu